Spring Hill is an unincorporated community in Bowie County, Texas, United States. According to the Handbook of Texas, the community had a population of 209 in 2000. It is located within the Texarkana metropolitan area.

History
In the 1930s, the town reported a population of ten and two rated businesses. In 1945, it had one business and a population of forty. In 1984, Spring Hill had a sawmill, two churches, and a cemetery. In 1990, the population was 209. The population remained the same in 2000.

Geography

Education
Spring Hill had its own school in 1984. Today, the community is served by the DeKalb Independent School District.

References

Unincorporated communities in Bowie County, Texas
Unincorporated communities in Texas